The 19th British Academy Video Game Awards will be hosted by the British Academy of Film and Television Arts on 30 March 2023 to honour the best video games of 2022. Held at the Queen Elizabeth Hall in London, the ceremony will be hosted by esports presenter Frankie Ward for the first time, taking over from Elle Osili-Wood, who hosted the previous two ceremonies. The ceremony will be livestreamed exclusively on BAFTA's Twitch channel, hosted by games journalist Julia Hardy and comedian Inel Tomlinson.

Sony Interactive's action-adventure epic God of War Ragnarök received the most nominations, with fifteen, becoming the most nominated game in the history of the BAFTA Games Awards. Its closest competitor, the adventure game Stray published by Annapurna Interactive, received nine nominations.

Nominees and winners 
The nominees were announced by games journalist Julia Hardy and Twitch streamers Tubbo, CaptainPuffy, Leahviathan and Sharese on 2 March 2023 via a livestream held on BAFTA's Twitch channel. An additional panel of streamers, Ebonix, Lomadiah, ReadySetBen and SinowBeats were revealed as the "BAFTA Games Squad", who also streamed the nominations announcement and discussed their thoughts on the nominated games. The EE Game of the Year nominees, the only category voted for by the British public, were announced two days earlier on 28 February 2023, and were selected by a jury of ten industry professionals, with voting closing on 28 March, two days prior to the ceremony.

 BAFTA Fellowship: Shuhei Yoshida

Games with multiple nominations

References 

British Academy Games Awards ceremonies
British Academy Games
British Academy Games
British Academy Games